Franklinton Vlaie or "The Vlaie" is a tributary of Catskill Creek in Broome, Schoharie County, New York in the United States.

Vlaie or Vly is a word for swamp which comes from the Dutch settlers of the area.

See also
List of rivers of New York

References

Catskills
Rivers of Schoharie County, New York
Rivers of New York (state)